This article is about the particular significance of the year 1801 to Wales and its people.

Incumbents
Lord Lieutenant of Anglesey – Henry Paget 
Lord Lieutenant of Brecknockshire and Monmouthshire – Henry Somerset, 5th Duke of Beaufort
Lord Lieutenant of Caernarvonshire – Thomas Bulkeley, 7th Viscount Bulkeley
Lord Lieutenant of Cardiganshire – Thomas Johnes
Lord Lieutenant of Carmarthenshire – John Vaughan  
Lord Lieutenant of Denbighshire – Sir Watkin Williams-Wynn, 5th Baronet    
Lord Lieutenant of Flintshire – Robert Grosvenor, 1st Marquess of Westminster 
Lord Lieutenant of Glamorgan – John Stuart, 1st Marquess of Bute 
Lord Lieutenant of Merionethshire - Sir Watkin Williams-Wynn, 5th Baronet
Lord Lieutenant of Montgomeryshire – George Herbert, 2nd Earl of Powis (until 16 January); vacant until 1804
Lord Lieutenant of Pembrokeshire – Richard Philipps, 1st Baron Milford
Lord Lieutenant of Radnorshire – Thomas Harley

Bishop of Bangor – William Cleaver
Bishop of Llandaff – Richard Watson
Bishop of St Asaph – Lewis Bagot
Bishop of St Davids – Lord George Murray

Events
Chirk aqueduct is completed and opened.
First railway in north Wales is built by Lord Penrhyn to link his quarries with Bethesda and Port Penrhyn.
John Rice Jones becomes first attorney-general of Indiana.
The "Great Debate" is held at Ramoth Chapel in Llanfrothen, Merionethshire, as a result of which John Richard Jones forms the "Scottish Baptist" connexion.

Arts and literature

New books
Cyhoeddiadau Cymdeithas y Gwyneddigion
The Myvyrian Archaiology of Wales, vol. 1
Azariah Shadrach - Allwedd Myfyrdod
Hester Thrale - Retrospection: or a review of the most striking events, characters, situations, and their consequences, which the last eighteen hundred years have presented to the view of mankind

Music

Births
6 February - William Williams (Caledfryn), poet and critic (d. 1869)
24 May(probable) - Elizabeth Randles, harpist and pianist (d. 1829)
1 November - John Lloyd Davies, politician (d. 1860)
18 November - David Rees, minister and writer (d. 1869)
23 December - William Watkin Edward Wynne, politician (d. 1880)
date unknown - Thomas Phillips, lawyer, politician and businessman, mayor of Newport (d.1867)

Deaths
16 January - George Herbert, 2nd Earl of Powis, 45
14 February - Rice Jones, antiquary, 87
23 September - Thomas Nowell, historian, 71?
13 December - William Edwardes, 1st Baron Kensington, about 90

References

 Wales